The World Boxing Super Series (WBSS) is a professional boxing tournament organised by Comosa AG.

Each weight class features eight boxers competing in an annual knockout competition with the champion from each weight class taking the Muhammad Ali Trophy, named after the former heavyweight champion Muhammad Ali, and sharing a total prize fund of U.S. $50 million, with winner of each tournament receiving U.S. $10 million

History 
These tournaments are a joint venture between Sauerland Promotions and Richard Schaefer under the Comosa AG banner. The total prize money is $50 million.

This is considered the first major professional boxing tournament attempt since the Super Six World Boxing Classic, which took place from 2009 to 2011.

The first season of tournament was held from 2017 to 2018 at two weight classes: cruiserweight and super middleweight. The inaugural tournament started in September 2017 and finished with two finals in the summer of 2018. With the tournament, the cruiserweight division crowned its first undisputed champion since 2006.

At a press conference in London on 9 May 2018, a second season was announced, which took place from 2018 to 2019. Bantamweight and light welterweight was confirmed as two of the three weight classes involved. The third weight class was later revealed to be cruiserweight, following the 2017-18 tournament in that division.

The third season was announced in June 2021, with a single tournament for women's super featherweight boxers.

Qualification 
All WBA, WBC, WBO, and IBF world champions were eligible to participate in the tournament, as well as all top 15 world-ranked contenders by each of the 4 sanctioning bodies. Comosa AG contracted eight available fighters per weight class, as well as a few potential back-ups.

In both seasons Comosa has staged a draft gala in Monte Carlo and Moscow, Russia to publicly announce all tournament participants and determine the draw. During the gala, the four top seeds select their quarter-final opponents from the four unseeded boxers in a live TV show.

Judging 
In addition to the three judges customary in pro boxing, the World Boxing Super Series will be an additional fourth judge whose scorecard will be used if the main three judges deliver a draw result. The fourth judge can also come into play in the event that a tournament fight ends in a no contest or a no-decision and the three official scorecards do not determine a winner.

In the case of a draw, if two of the now four score the bout in for one boxer and at least one of the other two of the four judges score the bout a draw, the fight will be won by the boxer who won the bout in two scorecards. In addition, if a fight remains a draw even after adding the fourth judge's scorecard to those of the three official judges, the series will use a countback method to determine who advances in the tournament. The countback is a sudden-death method of scoring using the three official judges' scorecards to determine who advances. Beginning with the scorecards for the 12th or last round that occurred, the boxer who won that particular round on at least two of the three scorecards will advance. If the bout was scored evenly in the 12th round or the last round that occurred, the advancing boxer will then be determined by who won at least a majority of scorecards in the preceding round. If neither boxer won the penultimate round on at least a majority of the three official scorecards, each preceding round's scorecards will be examined until a round where one boxer was declared the winner of that round on a majority of the three official scorecards.

Seasons and finals

Awards 
The WBC intends to award the champions its commemorative Diamond title.  Additionally, the winners will receive the Muhammad Ali Trophy.

Due to the 'bracket style' nature of the tournament, the winner of each tournament could claim all world titles in the field. Oleksandr Usyk, the winner of the 2018 cruiserweight tournament, unified the WBO, IBF, WBC and WBA cruiserweight titles and became the first cruiserweight undisputed champion in over a decade, and the first in the four-belt era.

See also 
Super Six World Boxing Classic

References

External links 
 

 
Super Series
2017 in boxing
2018 in boxing
2019 in boxing
World Boxing Super Series
Recurring sporting events established in 2017